Brittain Dining Hall is the primary dining hall of East Campus at the Georgia Institute of Technology.  Dedicated in name of Marion L. Brittain, it serves as the primary dining location for all Freshman Experience and Area II housing residents. It is located between Techwood Drive and Williams Street, facing Bobby Dodd Stadium to its west.

History
While it was partially funded by the state of Georgia, a large part of the funding for Brittain Dining Hall came from the Athletic Association and the Georgia Tech Expansion Fund. Opened in 1928, it was a joint effort of many of Tech's departments: 

The building cost $418,000 to construct and was designed by the architects Bush-Brown & Gailey. Brittain Dining Hall was renovated in 1964, 1999, 2002, and again in summer 2007.

During the 2007 heatwave, Brittain Dining Hall went trayless to conserve water due to Atlanta, Georgia's severe water shortage.

Architecture

Brittain is based around two large wings that serve as dining areas. Patrons enter from the western entrance and serve themselves via the buffet. In between the two wings there is a staircase that leads up to a lobby, which overlooks the two wings and leads to the President's Dining Room. The President's Dining Room looks out on to the western lawn of Brittain, and was originally designed for serving the Institute's president and visiting dignitaries but was eventually converted to a dining area. In recent years however, there has once more been a restriction on the use of this second floor dining area because of the tendency of the Institute's students to put new meaning to "food on the fly".

The southern wing is highlighted by a large stained glass window designed by Julian Harris.  The window was dedicated to Georgia Tech graduating classes of 1928-1932. The entrance is marked by a Georgia School of Technology floor seal showing the age of Brittain Hall.

The back of Brittain dubbed "Brittain Rec" serves as the laundromat and meeting place for the Freshman Experience Program. Brittain Rec is divided into a Buzz Card activated laundry room, BuzzBy, East Side Market, and a ballroom for events.

Innovator dedications

Brittain Hall's Western Side faces Techwood Drive and Bobby Dodd Stadium. This side is the only entrance for patrons and features ten Doric pillars emblazoned with stylized busts of ten famous scientific minds and the fields to which they contributed; these are fields that were present at Georgia Tech during Brittain's 1928 construction. Civil engineering, mechanical engineering, and aerospace engineering are represented by Leonardo da Vinci. Ceramics is represented by Luca della Robbia. Textiles is represented by Eli Whitney. Electrical engineering is represented by Thomas Edison. Architecture and the fine arts are represented by Michelangelo. Physics is represented by Archimedes. Chemistry is represented by Antoine Lavoisier. Mathematics and astronomy are represented by Isaac Newton. Biology is represented by Aristotle. Ecology is represented by Charles Darwin.

Public reception
While Brittain Dining Hall caters to the nutritional needs of thousands of students weekly, it is largely regarded as the most inferior eatery on campus.  Despite the generally cordial staff, an overwhelming lack of variety contributes to this perception.  Students will often seek dining alternatives such as Buzzby, the Student Center food court, and various other dining locations on and off campus.

References

External links
Campus Map: Brittain Dining Hall

Buildings and structures completed in 1928
Georgia Tech buildings and structures